Authority is a 2014 novel by Jeff VanderMeer. It is the second in a series of three books called the Southern Reach Trilogy. In an interview, VanderMeer stated that, "if Annihilation is an expedition into Area X, then Authority is an expedition into the Southern Reach, the agency sending in the expeditions." It was released in May 2014.

Authority revolves around the operatives of the Southern Reach agency. The agency is responsible for the investigation into the unexplained phenomena of Area X. The second book takes place in the human inhabited areas unlike the first book, Annihilation, which was set within Area X.

Plot summary
John "Control" Rodriguez takes over as the new director of the Southern Reach, a government agency formed to manage a coastal region named Area X. The public is led to believe that the region suffered an environmental disaster and is isolated for safety; in truth, the region has been taken over by an unknown force changing the environs and ecosystem behind a largely impenetrable "border." He is a secret operative assigned by the mysterious Central group which oversees the Southern Reach. He comes from a family of operatives: his mother and grandfather are prominent and influential members. Control reports to a handler called "The Voice" at Central over phone calls and e-mail.

In his role as director, Control frequently encounters friction with the existing staff to various degrees: in particular, the assistant director Grace Stevenson, who seems to have an emotional attachment to his predecessor. Control methodically sifts through the accumulated data (interviews, photos, videos) and discovers that there have been many more expeditions into Area X than have been disclosed to the public. The all-male 11th expedition alone had multiple iterations with slightly different control factors similar to a lab experiment, leading to the formation of an all-female 12th expedition to see how this composition would interact with Area X. The 12th expedition's biologist was the protagonist of the previous novel, and the expedition's psychologist was, in fact, the previous director of the Southern Reach (whom he replaced), a fact that she did not reveal to the other members of the expedition.

The biologist mysteriously reappears in a vacant lot and is detained by the Southern Reach for debriefing; Control begins interrogating her. Slowly, he begins to empathize with her and understand her interest in the area's ecosystem. However, she is uncooperative, insisting that she is not the biologist and requesting that Control refers to her as Ghost Bird; after initially failing to gain any information about Area X or what happened there, his tactics become increasingly more unconventional.

Control suspects that he is under hypnosis and (correctly) surmises that his handler, "The Voice," is hypnotizing him to steer his investigation. He is able to throw off the effects of hypnosis and work more independently, but this alienates him from Central, and he relies on his mother to protect him from retaliation. Central forcibly removes the biologist from the Southern Reach, as they believe Control has developed an emotional attachment to her.

Control visits the previous director's house and makes discoveries that hint at a connection to Area X. After returning to Southern Reach headquarters, he has an unsettling interaction with one of the scientists in a hidden room. He tries to go to the science division but finds his path blocked by a wall that should not exist and appears to be alive. As he runs upstairs in terror, he sees that the border of Area X is moving, encroaching on the facility and leading with it a replica of the director. Control is the only member of Southern Reach who reacts to this development with alarm, and he abandons the facility as Area X envelops it. Returning home to pack, he encounters his mother and learns more about what has been happening. Control also realizes the director's identity as the little girl in a photo found at the lighthouse in Area X. This completely alters his outlook, as it is now clear that she is somehow profoundly interlinked with the anomaly.

Control also learns that the biologist has escaped Central. Based on his intuition and knowledge of the biologist's background, Control travels to the site of an old field study she had conducted before she came to the Southern Reach, with Central close behind despite his efforts to dodge their agents. Control finally meets the biologist at a remote location where she has unexpectedly created another portal to Area X at the bottom of a pool of water, a gateway that she believes has formed from a "brightness" she carried that has run its course through her. She jumps into the pool, and Control, hearing a voice in his head urging him to follow her, also jumps.

Reception 

Authority made the best sellers list for trade fiction paperback for the May 25, 2014 edition of The New York Times. Entertainment Weekly gave Authority a B+, saying that the story in Authority "elevates the series beyond bio-thriller to something truly compelling." The New York Times also gave Authority favorable review:

References

External links 
 The first chapter of Authority on Gizmodo

2014 American novels
American science fiction novels
English-language novels
Farrar, Straus and Giroux books